Vesuvius may also refer to:

Places
 Vesuvius, British Columbia, an unincorporated settlement in Canada also known as Vesuvius Bay and named after HMS Vesuvius
 Vesuvius, Virginia, an unincorporated community in the United States
 Vesuvius National Park, Italy, centered on the volcano
 13897 Vesuvius, an asteroid

Military
Battle of Vesuvius won by Rome in 340 BC
HMS Vesuvius, various Royal Navy ships (12 officially)
USS Vesuvius, several US Navy ships (5) with first directly named for the famous volcano
The code name for German World War II bases that were to launch the Wasserfall anti-aircraft missile
Vesuvius Airfield, an American World War II airfield in southern Italy

Arts and entertainment
"Vesuvius" (How I Met Your Mother), an episode of the TV series How I Met Your Mother
Vesuvius (UK record label), a British independent label
A wind orchestral piece written by Frank Ticheli about the eruption of Mount Vesuvius
"Vesuvius", a song by Sufjan Stevens, on his 2010 album Age of Adz
TCS Vesuvius, a starship in the Wing Commander science fiction universe
Vesuvius, a fictional band in the movie The Rocker
Vesuvius (band), a Canadian metal band, formed in 2012

Other uses
Vesuvius Observatory, Italy
A type of fireworks that resembles a volcano
Vesuvius plc a British maker of ceramic products